Bernt Frilén (3 June 1945 – 7 May 2019) was a Swedish orienteering competitor, winner of the 1974 Individual World Orienteering Championships. He also has an individual bronze medal from 1972. He was two times Relay World Champion, as a member of the Swedish winning teams in 1972 and 1974, as well as having a silver medal from 1970.

References

Swedish orienteers
Male orienteers
Foot orienteers
World Orienteering Championships medalists
1945 births
2019 deaths
20th-century Swedish people